The Church of St Stephen in Rochester Row, London, is a grade II* listed building.

The architect was Benjamin Ferrey and the foundation stone was laid on 20 July 1847. The completed church was consecrated with great ceremony on 24 June 1850, the Festival of the nativity of St John the Baptist.

Due to bomb damage to St John's, Smith Square, in 1941, its parish was united with St Stephen's on 24 November 1950, becoming the parish of St Stephen's with St John's.

On the 9 June 2022, Prince William, Duke of Cambridge sold The Big Issue on Rochester Row opposite and outside of the Church of St Stephen.

References

External links 
 Church website
 

Grade II* listed churches in the City of Westminster